Air Chief Marshal Herman Prayitno (born 9 January 1951 in Yogyakarta) was the Chief of Staff of the Indonesian Air Force from 13 February 2006 until 28 December 2007.

In September 2007, Prayitno announced that the air force would be increasing its capability by purchasing three maritime surveillance aircraft, six Sukhoi fighter jets, several NAS-332 Super Puma helicopters and KT-1B training aircraft.

In 2012, Prayitno was appointed as Indonesia's ambassador to Malaysia and served until 2017.

References
  Biography of Air Chief Marshal Herman Prayitno 

|-

1951 births
Living people
People from Yogyakarta
Indonesian Air Force air marshals
Ambassadors of Indonesia to Malaysia
Chiefs of Staff of the Indonesian Air Force